V.I.P. is an American action/dramedy television series starring Pamela Anderson. Created by J. F. Lawton, the series aired in syndication for four seasons from 1998 to 2002.

Synopsis
Anderson stars as Vallery Irons, a woman who accidentally saves a celebrity and then is hired by a real bodyguard agency (V.I.P. aka Vallery Irons Protection) as a famous figurehead while the rest of the agency's professionals work to solve cases.  Her lack of investigation skills ends up defeating the antagonists in every episode.

The other team members are an assortment of people of different backgrounds: a former member of the KGB, CIA, FBI, a computer expert, a former law officer, a former street boxer/martial artist and, later, a karate master/stuntman joined.

The series uses a mixture of action, comedy, and camp, with Anderson often poking fun at her tabloid image. In November, 2001, a video game version of V.I.P. was released on the PlayStation console.

Many first-season episodes opened with cameos of famous celebrities being protected by Vallery. Among them were Stone Cold Steve Austin, Jay Leno, Charles Barkley, Jerry Springer and Alfonso Ribeiro. Loni Anderson guest-starred in one episode as Vallery's mother. In season 2, Lisa Marie Varon had an uncredited appearance as a bodyguard.
Kathleen Kinmont-See (Fraternity Vacation) was a guest star in the season-4 episode: South By Southwest.

Cast 
Pamela Anderson — Vallery Irons, the glamorous figurehead
Molly Culver —Natasha "Tasha" Dexter, a former spy and model
Natalie Raitano — Nicole "Nikki" Franco, a weapons and explosives expert
Angelle Brooks — Maxine De La Cruz (Seasons 3–4, recurring seasons 1–2), Vallery's best friend
Shaun Baker — Quick Williams, a former boxer and martial artist
Dustin Nguyen — Johnny Loh (Seasons 3–4, recurring seasons 1–2), a karate master and stuntman
Leah Lail — Kay Simmons, a computer expert

Episodes

Merchandise
On March 14, 2006, Sony Pictures Home Entertainment released the first season of V.I.P. on DVD in Region 1.

Before the DVD, V.I.P. expanded to video game from Ubi Soft, for the PC, PlayStation, PlayStation 2, Game Boy Color and Game Boy Advance in 2001 and 2002.

In 2000, Johnny Lightning released two sets of V.I.P. themed diecast cars in 1/64 scale.  There were 8 different vehicles issued in total.

The series V.I.P. was co-produced with Telewizja Polsat from Poland. This is the first foreign series co-created by this station. This station is the exclusive broadcasting company in Poland.

Awards and nominations
In 1999, the series was nominated for a Primetime Emmy Award for Outstanding Main Title Theme Music. In 2002, V.I.P. was nominated for three Daytime Emmy Awards, winning one for Outstanding Single Camera Editing.

Syndication
The show premiered in syndication on September 26, 1998. As of February 2009, the show can be streamed for free in the US on Internet Movie Database, Hulu, and Minisodes and full episodes are available on Crackle.  In Canada, episodes are available on Netflix.  Episodes in Spanish debuted on CineSony on February 14, 2014.

References

External links
 

1998 American television series debuts
2002 American television series endings
1990s American comedy-drama television series
2000s American comedy-drama television series
American action television series
American action comedy television series
English-language television shows
First-run syndicated television programs in the United States
Television series by Sony Pictures Television
Television shows set in Beverly Hills, California
Works about bodyguards